Kubanacan is a Brazilian telenovela produced and broadcast by TV Globo. It premiered on 5 May 2003, replacing O Beijo do Vampiro, and ended on 24 January 2004, replaced by Da Cor do Pecado. The telenovela is written by Carlos Lombardi, with the collaboration of Emanoel Jacobina, Margareth Boury, Tiago Santiago, and Vinícius Vianna.

It stars Marcos Pasquim, Adriana Esteves, Danielle Winits, Vladimir Brichta, Carolina Ferraz, Humberto Martins, Betty Lago, and Werner Schünemann.

Plot
The story begins in 1951 in Kubanacan, a small Caribbean island country known as a "banana republic", both for its prime export and its economic problems. After the death of the current president, General Carlos Camacho (Humberto Martins) imposes a coup d'état and establishes a dictatorial regime. In addition, the new ruler marries the wife of her predecessor, Mercedes (Betty Lago), first lady loved by the people for her help to the poor and with whom she had an affair for years. In the village of Santiago, a mysterious man falls from the sky during a storm with a chest shot, being saved by the fishermen and cared for by Marisol (Danielle Winits). Without memory, Esteban (Marcos Pasquim) falls in love with the girl and disputes his heart with her husband, Enrico (Vladimir Brichta), who leaves and lets his ex-wife live with the new love, who takes over her two children. Seven years later, in 1958, Marisol meets Camacho, who convinces her to leave and live as his mistress, claiming she would never get out of poverty in the village.

Esteban believes his wife died on the high seas as a result of third parties and leaves for La Bendita to take revenge, which brings out a double personality, the violent evil character Dark Esteban. In the capital he bumps into Enrico again, now married to Lola (Adriana Esteves), who ironically also falls in love with the amnesiac. Enrico's real lover is Rubi (Carolina Ferraz), Lola's sister, who dreams of joining the army and whom men have never looked for in the absence of vanity, since she dresses like a man and lives dirty for working as a man. In the city the sons of Mercedes still live there - Guillermo (Daniel Del Sarto), who always tries to unmask his stepfather's betrayals, and Mercedita (Tatyane Goulart) a caricature of his mother - besides Camacho's only son, Carlito (Iran Malfitano), who works all night and has several cases, just like his father. He dates the futile Consuelo (Fernanda de Freitas) and is loved by the sweet Soledad (Rafaela Mandelli), who never received a look from the boy for being shy and virginal, but sends him anonymous letters, arousing his passion, which he longs to know.

There is also Dagoberto (Bruno Garcia), the president's secretary who becomes indirectly responsible for government decisions, and Johnny (Daniel Boaventura), a US-raised playboy who becomes Esteban's close friend. Camacho hires Adriano, a Miami attorney who is identical to Esteban and who eventually takes over the presidency, which leads to confusion. In addition, General Alejandro (Werner Schünemann), a former exiled president on the island of La Platina, returns to take revenge on Camacho and destroy the country for good by building Projeto Fênix (Phoenix Project), a nuclear weapon of mass destruction. Throughout the plot it turns out that Esteban is actually called Leon and came from the future to prevent Alejandro's plans. He is the son of the real Esteban, who lives in a cabin near the capital, who got Rubi pregnant without her knowing that he was not the boy she had met. The real Esteban is Adriano's twin brother and the two are Alejandro's sons.

Cast

 Marcos Pasquim as Esteban / Adriano Allende / León
 Adriana Esteves as Lola
 Danielle Winits as Marisol
 Vladimir Brichta as Enrico
 Carolina Ferraz as Rubi
 Humberto Martins as Carlos Camacho
 Betty Lago as Mercedes
 Bruno Garcia as Dagoberto
 Daniel Boaventura as Johnny
 Nair Bello as Dolores
 Ângela Vieira as Perla Perón
 Werner Schünemann as Alejandro Rivera
 Marco Ricca as Celso Camacho
 André Mattos as Agustin Tavalera
 Ítalo Rossi as Trujillo
 Lolita Rodrigues as Isabelita
 Mário Gomes as Ferdinando
 Françoise Forton as Concheta
 Mara Manzan as Agatha
 Daniel del Sarto as Guillermo
 Thalma de Freitas as Dalila
 Gero Pestalozzi as Ramon
 Pedro Malta as Gabriel
 Adriano Reys as Pitágoras
 Ana Rosa as Piedad
 Bete Coelho as Cristal
 Marcos Breda as Che Lopez and the captain of the ship who brings Celso Camacho
 Luiz Carlos Tourinho as Everest
 Marilu Bueno as Sodoma
 Ingrid Guimarães as Rosita
 Othon Bastos as Dr. Orthiz 
 Thaís de Campos as Lulu
 Otávio Augusto as Hector
 Iran Malfitano as Carlito
 Rafaela Mandelli as Soledad
 Lorena da Silva as Pinita (Ana María Pina Estalva Machado)
 Paula Manga as Catarina
 Stepan Nercessian as Godofredo
 Fernanda de Freitas as Consuelo
 Natália Lage as Frida
 Nadia Rowinsky as Madalena
 Gabriel Braga Nunes as Victor
 Sérgio Loroza as Paulão 
 Helena Fernandes as Marieta
 Tatyane Goulart as Mercedita

Soundtrack

National
Cover: Danielle Winits

Carnavalera - Havana Delírio
Quizás, Quizás, Quizás - Emmanuel
No Me Platiques Más - Cristian
Contigo Aprendi - José Feliciano
Somente Eu e Você (Moonglow) - Ivete Sangalo
Mulher - Sidney Magal
Como Um Rio (Cry Me a River) - Vanessa Jackson
Capullito de Aleli - Caetano Veloso
Mezcla - Rio Salsa
Foo Foo - Santana e Patricia Materola
Hit the Road Jack - Happening
Mambo No. 5 - Tropical Brazilian Band
Contigo En La Distancia - Nana Caymmi
Eu Só Me Ligo Em Você (I Get a Kick Out Of You) - Elza Soares
Coubanakan - Ney Matogrosso
Voy Volver - Alpha Beat

International
Cover: Marcos Pasquim

La Puerta - Luis Miguel 
Fever - Michael Bublé
Copacabana - Happening
Mambo Italiano - Mambo Project
Perfidia - Laura Fygi
Tan Solo Tu y Yo (Moonglow) - Ivete Sangalo
No Me Platiques Más - Gisela
The Look of Love) - Dusty Springfield
El Hombre Que Yo Amé (The Man I Love) - Omara Portuondo
Laura - Frank Sinatra
Wipe Out - The Surfaris
The Man With The Golden Arm (Delilah Jones) - Billy May
Guantánamo - Pablo Gonzales
Mambo Caliente - Bahamas

References

External links 
 

2003 telenovelas
2003 Brazilian television series debuts
2004 Brazilian television series endings
Brazilian telenovelas
TV Globo telenovelas
Brazilian science fiction television series
Espionage television series
Portuguese-language telenovelas
Television series set in fictional countries